James Ralph Scales (May 27, 1919 – March 12, 1996) was president of Oklahoma Baptist University (his alma mater), 1961–1965, and eleventh president of Wake Forest University, from 1968-1983. He was a member of the Cherokee Nation and was active throughout his life in Cherokee affairs.

Background and career
Scales was born in Delaware County, Oklahoma to John Grover, Senior, and Katie Scales. John Grover Scales, Senior, had been born in 1889 in Spavinaw Creek, Indian Territory and was a Baptist pastor until his death in 1971. Katie and Scales together had two sons, James Ralph and John Grover, Junior, who died in 1953 at age 30.

Scales began his career in education after graduating with his undergraduate and master's degrees from Oklahoma Baptist University in 1939 and 1941. Scales then served in the U.S. Navy from 1942 to 1945 during World War II, earning medals of honor and distinction for his service. Scales then followed his career in higher education as an associate professor and professor, from 1947 to 1961. He moved to college administration in 1950, moving to vice president (1950-1953), executive vice president (1953-1961), and president (1961-1965). 
In 1965, Scales became dean of the College of the Arts and Sciences and a professor of political science at Oklahoma State University. While living in Oklahoma, Scales was active in Democratic Party politics, serving as an alternate for the 1956 Democratic National Convention. 
In 1967, Scales became the eleventh president of Wake Forest University. During his time at Wake Forest, Scales oversaw an increased undergraduate enrollment and an expanded academic curriculum. He was responsible for a fine arts center building project, later named the James R. Scales Fine Arts Center, and the acquisition of Worrell House in London, England, and Casa Artom in Venice, Italy. Scales resigned from the Office of the President in 1983.

His wife, Elizabeth Ann (Randel) Scales was born in Osage County, Oklahoma. Known as Betty Ann, she earned a B.A. degree from Oklahoma Baptist University in 1939. Betty Ann helped lead various college, social, and Baptist organizations while raising two daughters, Ann Catherine, a notable lawyer who coined the term "feminist jurisprudence," and Laura Elizabeth Scales, who died at age 20 in 1969. Betty Ann died on August 11, 1992.

References

 Oklahoma politics : a history / by Scales, James R. (James Ralph), 1919–. LAWTON PUBLIC LIBRARY. Accessed 2011-01-21.
 A Brief History of OBU. Oklahoma Baptist University. Accessed 2011-01-21.
 A History of Wake Forest University Timeline. Wake Forest University Z. Smith Reynolds Library Special Collections and Archives. Accessed 2018-10-19.

1919 births
1996 deaths
People from Delaware County, Oklahoma
Presidents of Oklahoma Baptist University
Presidents of Wake Forest University
Military personnel from Oklahoma
Oklahoma Democrats
Educators from Oklahoma
United States Navy personnel of World War II
20th-century American academics
Native American academics
Cherokee Nation academics